Labor of Love is a 1998 Lifetime television film starring Marcia Gay Harden and David Marshall Grant. It was directed by Karen Arthur and written by Nina Shengold.
The story centers around  a single woman (Marcia Gay Harden) who decides to have a baby with her gay best friend (David Marshall Grant). But soon after, she meets the man of her dreams (Daniel Hugh Kelly), which complicates their situation.

References

External links

1998 television films
1998 films
1998 drama films
Lifetime (TV network) films
1990s English-language films
American LGBT-related television films
Films directed by Karen Arthur
1990s American films